HD 222399 is a double star in the northern constellation of Andromeda. The magnitude 6.57 primary is an F-type subgiant star with a stellar classification of F2IV. It has a magnitude 10.57 companion at an angular separation of 14.7″ along a position angle of 162° (as of 2002).

References

External links
 Image HD 222399

Andromeda (constellation)
222399
Double stars
F-type subgiants
8973
Durchmusterung objects
116781